The State of Khairpur (، ), also transliterated as Khayrpur, was a princely state of British India on the Indus River in northern Sindh, modern Pakistan, with its capital city at Khairpur. It was established as capital for the Sohrabani branch of the Talpur dynasty, and was established shortly after Talpur ascendency in 1783 as one of several Talpur dominions. Whereas the other Talpur dominions were conquered by the British in 1843, the Khairpur state entered into treaty with the British, thereby maintaining some of its autonomy as a princely state. The last Mir of Khairpur opted to join the new state of Pakistan in 1947, and the dominion was thus made a Princely state of Pakistan, until it was fully amalgamated into West Pakistan in 1955.

History

The Talpur dynasty was established in 1783 by Mir Fateh Ali Khan, who declared himself the first Rais, or ruler of Sindh, after defeating the Kalhoras at the Battle of Halani. The nephew of Mir Fateh Ali Khan, Mir Sohrab Khan Talpur, established a branch of the Talpur dynasty in 1783 in Burahan, which was renamed Khairpur in 1783.

The death of Mir Sohrab Khan Talpur, founder of the Khairpur branch abdicated power to his eldest son Mir Rustam 'Ali Khan, in 1811.

Rustam's youngest half brother, 'Ali Murad, strengthened his hand by signing a treaty with the British in 1832, in which he secured recognition as the independent ruler of Khairpur in exchange for surrendering control of foreign relations to the British in 1838, as well as use of Sindh's roads and the Indus River. His position had been little more than that of a regent during his father's lifetime, and this was to remain unchanged until his youngest half brother, 'Ali Murad, came of age. Nevertheless, this did not save him from internal family disputes, in which the British initially refused to treat or take sides.

Rustam ruled until 1842, when abdicated in favor of his youngest brother Mir Ali Murad. Ali Murad helped the British in 1845-7 during the Turki campaign, but was later accused of plotting against the British in 1851–2, and so was stripped of his lands in upper Sindh by the British East India Company. As a result, the remaining land under his control consisted mostly of Khairpur city, and its immediate environs. During the 1857 Sepoy Mutiny, Ali Murad sided which the British, and prevented rebels from seizing the Shikarpur jail and treasury. He regained the favour of the British, and in 1866, the British promised to recognize any future successors as rightful rulers of Khairpur. Ali Murad's rule went on uninterrupted until his death in 1894.

Ali Murad's eldest son had predeceased him, and so he was succeeded by his second son, Mir Faiz Muhammad Khan, who ruled until his death 1909. He was in turn succeeded by his son, Mir Sir Imam Bakhsh Khan Talpur, who aided the British war effort during World War I, and was thus awarded the honorary title Lieutenant-Colonel in 1918. He died in 1921, and was succeeded by His Highness Mir Ali Nawaz Khan. Under his rule, the feudal Cherr system of forced labour was abolished, while new canals were laid for irrigation.

Mir Ali Nawaz Khan died in 1935, and was succeeded by Mir Faiz Muhammad Khan II, who had suffered from an unstable and nervous affliction, then became nominal leader. The Khairpur government instituted a council of regency under local ministers and ordered the Mir to live outside the state. After a period of twelve years, and shortly before the transfer of power, he abdicated in favour of his young son Mir George Ali Murad Khan in July 1947. The young Mir had reached his majority and received full ruling powers only four years earlier. The state was the first on the sub-continent to introduce full adult suffrage. His subjects enjoyed free education up to matriculation standard and free healthcare, there were no customs duties, property, income or wealth taxes. The crime rate remained negligible, and light industries flourished.

Khaipur state acceded to the Dominion of Pakistan in October that year, and merged into West Pakistan in 30 September 1955. Its last ruler, Mir George Ali Murad Khan, remains one of the few surviving first class rulers of the old British Indian Empire, still holding a public Majlis every Muharram at his sprawling palace, Faiz Mahal. He has long taken a keen interest in animal welfare and conservation, having established one of the largest private wildlife sanctuaries on the sub-continent. His younger son, Prince Mehdi Raza Khan, continues his father's passion and oversees his conservation interests since retirement.

Administration

The form of government was traditional monarchy. The ruler held the title of "Mir" and ruled with the assistance of a diwan or Wazir who at times was an official borrowed from the Indian Civil Service. The state was sub-divided into five taluks grouped into two sub-divisions. They are the Khairpur sub-division comprising the Khairpur and Gambat taluks and the Mir Wah sub-division comprising Mir Wah, Faiz Ganj and Naro taluks.The two sub-divisions were administered by a naib-wazir each while mukthiarkars were incharge of the taluks. The external relations of the state were in the control of a political agent who was usually the District Collector of Sukkur.

Demographics 

The princely state of Khairpur had a population of 227,183 in 1931 of whom 186,577 (83%) were Muslims, 39894 (17%) were Hindus and people of other religions numbering 712. Hindus were moatly concentrated in the Nara taluk in the east while there were present in substantial numbers in the urban areas of Gambat and Raipur due to migrations. Half the population of Khairpur town was Hindu. Nearly two-thirds of the princely state's population lived on agriculture.

List of rulers 

The Talpur dynasty rulers used title Mir. The Mir George Ali Murad Khan Talpur was the last ruler of dynasty defeated by the Charles James Napier in 1843 at the Battle of Miani.

See also
 Princely States
 Khairpur (disambiguation)
 Former administrative units of Pakistan

References

External links
Green Pioneers (United Nations Development Program site)

Khairpur District
Muslim princely states of India
Princely states of Pakistan
1775 establishments in India
1955 disestablishments in Pakistan
History of Sindh
Talpur dynasty
Princely rulers of Pakistan
Nawabs of Pakistan